Centennial Wash is an ephemeral dry wash that forms the final watershed of the Gila River in central Arizona – before the river turns south. From the Centennial Wash confluence, the Gila turns south, then southwest to exit Arizona on the California border adjacent Yuma.

The Centennial Wash drainage is adjacent to the south-flowing Hassayampa River Drainage on the east; the next drainage east is the Agua Fria Drainage (as shown on map). To the south as the Gila River makes its turns, arriving at the Painted Rock Reservoir, the Hassayampa and Centennial Wash drainages abut the Lower Gila–Painted Rock Reservoir Drainage.

See also 
 Bouse Wash
 List of rivers of Arizona

External links 
 Centennial Wash Drainage Map
 Lower Gila–Painted Rock Reservoir Drainage Map

Washes of Arizona
Rivers of Maricopa County, Arizona
Tributaries of the Gila River